Ruanoho is a genus of triplefin blennies (family Tripterygiidae). It is known from the southwestern Pacific Ocean off New Zealand.  The generic name is a compound noun derived from the Māori rua meaning either "fish" or "hole" and noho meaning to "dwell" which refers to the habit of the species in this genus to shelter under rocks or within crevices.

Species
 Longfinned triplefin, Ruanoho decemdigitatus (Clarke, 1879)
 Spectacled triplefin, Ruanoho whero Hardy, 1986

References

 
Tripterygiidae
Ray-finned fish genera
Endemic fauna of New Zealand
Taxa named by Graham Stuart Hardy